Hindukusch is a location near BajgirAqcha  in Aqcha District, Jowzjan Province in northern Afghanistan. The settlement is situated 6 km from Aqchah near Aqcha south of the settlement Haidarabad and is about 65 km from Balkh (ancient town).

References 

Jowzjan Province